There are two lists of Royal Navy ships:

 List of active Royal Navy ships  lists all currently commissioned vessels in the Royal Navy.
 List of ship names of the Royal Navy lists all names that Royal Navy ships ever bore.

See also

Bibliography of 18th–19th century Royal Naval history
 List of Royal Navy vessels active in 1981
 List of Royal Navy vessels active in 1982

 List of Royal Navy ships
 List of Royal Navy ships